Aleksandr Rakhmanov (born 28 August 1989) is a Russian chess grandmaster.

Chess career
Born in 1989, Rakhmanov earned his international master title in 2006 and his grandmaster title in 2007. In March 2018, he competed in the European Individual Chess Championship. He placed 140th, scoring 5½/11 (+5–5=1). The following year, he competed again in the European Individual Chess Championship. He placed 21st with 7½/11 (+4–0=7) and qualified for the Chess World Cup 2019.

References

External links
 
  
 
 

1989 births
Living people
Chess grandmasters
People from Cherepovets
Russian chess players